Robyn Hughes is a politician from Auckland, New Zealand.  She represented Manukau City on the Auckland Regional Council between 1904 and 2007.  In the 2007 Auckland local body elections she failed to gain re-election, winning only three votes.

She is a member of the left-wing Residents Action Movement, which advocates free and frequent public transport within the Auckland region as a solution to both climate change and the city's gridlock.

References

Auckland regional councillors
21st-century New Zealand women politicians
Living people
Year of birth missing (living people)
Residents Action Movement politicians
Unsuccessful candidates in the 2008 New Zealand general election